Kronoberg County or Region Kronoberg held a regional council election on 9 September 2018, on the same day as the general and municipal elections.

Results
The number of seats remained at 61 with the Social Democrats winning the most at 19, a drop of three from 2014.

Municipalities

References

Elections in Kronoberg County
Kronoberg